The 2002–03 Eliteserien season was the 64th season of ice hockey in Norway. Nine teams participated in the league, and Valerenga Ishockey won the championship.

Regular season

Playoffs

Relegation

External links
Season on hockeyarchives.info

GET-ligaen seasons
Norway
GET